820 Olive or 825 South Hill, is a residential and retail tower in downtown Los Angeles, California that is located within walking distance from Staples Center, L.A. Live, and the Broadway. It was developed by Onni Group and designed by Chris Dikeakos Architects. It has 49 floors. At the time of its completion, it became the tallest residential tower in California.

History
The building site was previously used as a parking lot. 

Part of the site, at the southwest corner of Eighth and Hill was the location of the RKO Hillstreet Theatre, 801 S. Hill St., opened 1922, architect G. Albert Lansburgh, closed 1963, demolished 1965.

In 2014, Onni Group announced that they would build a residential skyscraper on the site. On 12 January 2016, the developer obtained grading and shoring permits from the City of Los Angeles Department of Building and Safety to build the building on the site. The project later groundbroke in February 2016. It then followed by foundation works in July of that year. The building topped out in 2018. Following the completion of its interior works, 820 Olive opened on 15 February 2019.

See also
List of tallest buildings in Los Angeles
List of tallest buildings in California

References

External links
820 Olive Los Angeles Website

Buildings and structures in Downtown Los Angeles